Katherine Dodds is a Canadian Impact Producer, writer, artist, and filmmaker.

In 2001 Dodds founded the social cause communications company Good Company Communications Inc, which is doing business as Hello Cool World. Dodds is the creative director and strategist behind all Hello Cool World projects. Most known for their work designing the logo and doing the grassroots marketing for the award-winning box office hit film The Corporation which had its theatrical launch in January 2004, Hello Cool World is still campaigning on behalf of the film, linking it to movement building to reduce corporate harm.

Hello Cool World is also the Canadian distributor for the award-winning documentary 65 Redroses, and the educational sub-distributor of the 2017 Film "Indian Horse," based on the book of the same name by the acclaimed Indigenous author Richard Wagamese.

In 2016 Dodds was profiled as an "Impact Producer" in Tracey Friesen's book "Story Money Impact: Funding Media for Social Change"(Routledge, 2016). Dodds is currently the Impact Producer for "The New Corporation" - the sequel to the first film which is being directed by Joel Bakan and Jennifer Abbott. She is directing the digital media companion project "TheNewCorporation.app," alongside a new platform for impact engagement"Cool.World". Dodds and Bakan pitched their impact campaign at the November 2018 Good Pitch Vancouver. July 19, 2021 Bakan and Dodds filed a constitutional challenge accuses Twitter, Canadian government of failing to protect freedom of expression and democracy over refusal to allow ads about Canadian documentary film, due to Twitter's refusal to boost an ad for The New Corporation.

In 1992 Dodds worked as marketing manager for Adbusters magazine, and worked as an associate editor from 1992-1997 during which time she gave talks representing Adbusters' work and campaigns. She directed the 'uncommercial' Obsession Fetish, which parody's Calvin Klein, and addressed eating disorders with the tagline "The beauty industry is the beast".

Dodds is the writer of Picturing Transformation Nexw-áyantsut a book published in October 2013 by Figure 1 Publishing. The book features the photographic artwork of Uts'am Witness Project co-founder Nancy Bleck and was written with Bleck and Squamish Nation Hereditary Chief Bill Williams.

Education
Dodds studied painting at the University of Victoria in the 1980s, graduating with an honours BFA in 1985. She got an MA with distinction from the University of Leeds, UK in 1998 in feminist theory and the visual arts.

Awards
In 2006 Dodds received a "Woman of Vision" Artistic Achievement Award from Women in Film Video Vancouver for her work in multi-media.

Dodds is recipient of a 2019 BC Community Achievement Award

References

Living people
Canadian women artists
Canadian painters
Canadian multimedia artists
Canadian non-fiction writers
Canadian women non-fiction writers
University of Victoria alumni
Alumni of the University of Leeds
Year of birth missing (living people)